Țăndărei is a town in Ialomița County, Muntenia, Romania, with a population of 13,219. The town is located on the Bărăgan Plain, on the left bank of the Ialomița River. It was declared a town in 1968. It is crossed by the national road , which connects Slobozia with Constanța.

Țăndărei has been called a "Beverley Hills for Romanian gangsters". The town gained this reputation as many ethnic Roma engaged in criminal activity as well as welfare fraud in the UK, using the money obtained from those activies to build opulent villas.

During the COVID-19 pandemic, the town was also in the spotlight of national media and of social media, due to the fact that the ethnic Roma of the town were accused of bringing the virus from Western Europe and not respecting the anti-COVID measurements implemented by the government.

Demographics 
In the 2011 census, 65.47% of the population declared themselves as ethnic Romanian and 10.85% as Roma (23.55% did not declare any ethnicity and 0.11% declared another ethnicity).

References

Towns in Romania
Populated places in Ialomița County
Localities in Muntenia
Romani communities in Romania